Mirsky is a surname. Notable people with the surname include: 

Alexander Mirsky (born 1964), Latvian politician
Alfred Mirsky (1900–1974)
Boris Mirkin-Getzevich (1892–1955), better known by his pen name Boris Mirsky
D. S. Mirsky (1890–1939)
Eytan Mirsky (born 1961)
Jeannette Mirsky
Jonathan Mirsky (1932–2021), American journalist and historian of China
Leon Mirsky (1918–1983), mathematician
Mark Jay Mirsky
Steve Mirsky

Other 
Mirsky's theorem
Mirsky's Worst of the Web
Boris Mirski Gallery

See also 
Mirskis, a surname
Svyatopolk-Mirsky